Nationality words link to articles with information on the nation's poetry or literature (for instance, Irish or France).

Events

Works published

Great Britain
 Nicholas Breton, The Pilgrimage to Paradise
 Thomas Churchyard, A Handful of Gladsome Verses: Given to the Queenes Majesty at Woodstocke
 Henry Constable, Diana, sonnets (see also Diana 1594)
 Samuel Daniel, Delia, sonnets; dedicated to the Countess of Pembroke (see also Delia and Rosamond Augmented 1594)
 Gabriel Harvey, Three Letters, and Certaine Sonnets: Especially touching Robert Greene, and other parties, by him abused, poetry and prose; also published this year, the related Foure Letters and Certain Sonnets (see also Three Proper, and Whittie, Familiar Letters 1580)
 Richard Johnson, The Nine Worthies of London, poetry and prose
 Edmund Spenser, Daphnaïda. An Elegy upon the death of the noble and vertuous Douglas Howard, Daughter and heire of Henry Lord Howard, Viscount Byndon, and wife of Arthure Gorges Esquier (although one source states the work was first published in London in January of this year, another states the book was published in 1591)
 William Warner, Albions England: The Third Time Corrected and Augmented, third edition, with 9 books (see also Albions England 1586, second edition 1589, fourth edition 1596, fifth edition 1602, A Continuance of Albions England 1606)

Other
 Jean de Sponde, a Latin translation of Hesiod, with commentaries; France

Births
Death years link to the corresponding "[year] in poetry" article:
 January 16 (bapt.) – Henry King (died 1669), English poet and bishop
 March – Pedro Bucaneg (died 1630), blind Filipino poet, called the "Father of Ilokano literature"
 April 9 – Juraj Tranovský, also known as "George" (instead of Juraj) or (Latinized version) "Tranoscius" (died 1637), Czech and Slovak hymnwriter, sometimes called the father of Slovak hymnody and the "Luther of the Slavs"
 May 8 – Francis Quarles (died 1644), English
 August 1 – François le Métel de Boisrobert (died 1662), French
 December 7 – Ingen (died 1673), Chinese Linji Chan Buddhist monk, poet, and calligrapher
 Also:
 Wang Duo (died 1652), Chinese calligrapher, painter and poet
 Arnauld de Oihenart (died 1668), Basque historian and poet
 Emanuele Tesauro (died 1675), Italian rhetorician, dramatist, Marinist poet and historian

Deaths
Birth years link to the corresponding "[year] in poetry" article:
 February 10 – Patrick Adamson (born 1537), Scottish divine, archbishop of St Andrews, diplomat and Latin-language poet
 September 3 – Robert Greene (born 1558), English author best remembered for a posthumously-published pamphlet containing a polemic attack on William Shakespeare
 September 26 (bur.) – Thomas Watson (born 1555), English lyrical poet

See also

 Poetry
 16th century in poetry
 16th century in literature
 Dutch Renaissance and Golden Age literature
 Elizabethan literature
 English Madrigal School
 French Renaissance literature
 Renaissance literature
 Spanish Renaissance literature
 University Wits

Notes

16th-century poetry
Poetry